LCFR may refer to:

 Lead-cooled fast reactor, a type of fast neutron reactor
 Liberty City Free Radio, a radio station in the video game Grand Theft Auto: Liberty City Stories
 Liquid Chloride Fast Reactor, a type of molten salt reactor